The Metropolitan PGA Championship is a golf tournament that is the section championship of the Metropolitan section of the PGA of America. It has been played annually since 1926 at a variety of courses around the New York City metropolitan area. It was considered a PGA Tour event in the 1920s and 1930s. It is also known as simply the Metropolitan PGA or Met PGA.

History 
In 1924, the Metropolitan PGA hosted its first championship. It was a one-round tournament held at Rockaway Hunting Club which was won by Walter Hagen. Though sometimes referred to as the Metropolitan PGA Championship it is different from this event. The "first annual" Metropolitan PGA Championship was held in 1926 at Salisbury Country Club in Salisbury, New York on Long Island. In the finals, playing against "strong winds," Joe Turnesa "played wonderful golf" to defeat Joe Sylvester 6 & 5.

Winners 

Source:

1 Hartmann defeated Alexander and Wassem on first sudden-death playoff hole with a bogey.
2 Alexander defeated Wassem on the first sudden-death playoff hole with a par.
3 Wright defeated Glenz on the first sudden-death playoff hole.
4 Rain-shortened event. The second round was cancelled due to rain.
5 Marr (72) defeated Ford (75) in an 18-hole playoff.
6 Merrins (71) defeated Mayfield (75) in an 18-hole playoff.
7Turnesa tied Brosch after the first 35-hole playoff. Turnesa won the second playoff.
8 Goggin (67) defeated Barron (71) and Strazza (73) in an 18-hole playoff.

References

External links
PGA of America – Metropolitan section

Former PGA Tour events
Golf in New York (state)
PGA of America sectional tournaments
Recurring sporting events established in 1924
1924 establishments in New York (state)